Tomaž Čižman (born February 13, 1965 in Črnuče) is a former Slovenian alpine skier.

World Cup results

Season standings

Olympic Games results

World Championships results

Sources
Profile at fis-ski.com

1965 births
Living people
Skiers from Ljubljana
Slovenian male alpine skiers
Olympic alpine skiers of Yugoslavia
Alpine skiers at the 1988 Winter Olympics
People from the City Municipality of Ljubljana